An Overshot Mill in Aberdulais, Wales is an 1847 oil on canvas painting by the British artist James Ward in the National Library of Wales.

This painting shows the water mill located at the junction of the Dulais river and the Neath, near Aberdulais Falls. The scene was also painted by J.M.W. Turner.

The same scene in old prints:

References

External links

artwork record on Europeana website

1847 paintings
Paintings in the National Library of Wales
Wales in art